Pullaiahgaripalli (P.G.Palli) is a neighbourhood village of Tirupati. It is a part of Tirupati urban agglomeration and located in Chandragiri mandal. It falls in the jurisdictional limit of Tirupati Urban Development Authority.

Governance
Pullaiahgaripalli falls under Chandragiri assembly constituency in Andhra Pradesh.

References

Tirupati
Villages in Tirupati district